Deadly Sins is the seventh album by the American heavy metal band Seven Witches.

Track listing
All tracks by Jack Frost & Alan Tecchio except where noted.

 "Deadly Sins" – 3:55
 "Science" – 4:16
 "Commence" – 4:18
 "Worship" – 3:47
 "Knowledge" – 3:24
 "Pleasure" – 4:23
 "Wealth" – 3:19
 "Man of the Millennium" – 4:48
 "Politics" – 4:04
 "The Answer" (Frost, Bobby Lucas) – 4:38

Personnel 
Alan Tecchio – vocals
Jack Frost – guitars, vocals, engineer
Joey Vera – bass, producer, editing, mixing, mastering
Troll – drums
Kevin Bolembach – bass
Don Sternecker – engineer
Carl André Beckston – cover art, booklet design

References

2007 albums
Seven Witches albums
Locomotive Music albums